Rahul Sharma (born 20 July 1987) is an Indian cricketer. He is primarily a right-handed legbreak and googly bowler. He has been a member of the Punjab cricket team since 2006. He came into the limelight due to his impressive bowling performances in IPL 2011 for Pune Warriors.

Early career
Rahul started as a medium pacer but soon turned to leg spin on his coach. He made his debut in first class cricket on 25 December 2006 for Punjab against Rajasthan, but had to wait till 2009 to play again. In 2009–10 season of the Ranji Trophy, he took 13 wickets in seven first class games. Rahul played only one Ranji match in the 2010–11 season.

Indian Premier League

In 2010, Rahul Sharma made his IPL debut for Deccan Chargers. He took just five wickets and went at 8.08 an over in the six matches he played for Deccan Chargers. In the 2011 IPL, Rahul Sharma made a name for himself with some good bowling performances for Pune Warriors. His figures of 4-0-7-2 against Mumbai Indians were the most economical of 2011 Indian Premier League and the performance created enough of a buzz to see his name trend on Twitter in India. In 2015 rahul sharma was bought by Chennai Super kings in the ipl8 auction.

International career
On 8 December 2011, Rahul made his ODI debut for India in the 4th ODI against the West Indies and took three wickets. All three batsmen were bowled. In the same match Virender Sehwag set a new record(219) for the highest score in ODIs.
 Rahul scored his first run in One Day Internationals against Australia at the Melbourne Cricket Ground on 5 February 2012. He scored 1 run off 2 balls before being bowled by Xavier Doherty. 

On 1 February 2012, Rahul made his Twenty20 International debut for India in the 1st T20 of the series against Australia at the Stadium Australia/Sydney Olympic Park currently known as ANZ Stadium. He injured his finger while bowling his first over but came back later to continue bowling. His first Twenty20 International wicket was that of David Hussey who was bowled clean.

Bell's Palsy
Rahul Sharma had suffered from a form of facial paralysis called Bell's Palsy a few days before the beginning of the IPL 2010 series.

Controversies
Rahul Sharma was caught along with Wayne Parnell after he tested positive for consumption of drugs in a rave party. He later said he had no clue about the rave party and had gone there to attend a birthday celebration.

References

External links
Rahul Sharma - Wisden India Profile
 

Indian cricketers
India Twenty20 International cricketers
India One Day International cricketers
North Zone cricketers
India Red cricketers
Punjab, India cricketers
Deccan Chargers cricketers
Pune Warriors India cricketers
1986 births
Living people
Cricketers from Jalandhar
Chennai Super Kings cricketers